Belgium competed at the 1980 Summer Olympics in Moscow, USSR. In partial support of the American-led boycott of the 1980 Summer Olympics, Belgium competed under the Olympic Flag instead of its national flag. 59 competitors, 43 men and 16 women, took part in 51 events in 10 sports.

Medalists

Gold
 Robert Van de Walle — Judo, men's half-heavyweight (95 kg)

Archery

In Belgium's third appearance in the modern archery competition, the nation was represented by two men, including 1972 and 1976 Olympic veteran Robert Cogniaux.

Men's Individual Competition:
 Robert Cogniaux — 2414 points (→ 9th place)
 Willy van den Bossche — 2384 points (→ 17th place)

Athletics

Men's 400 metres
Fons Brijdenbach
Eddy De Leeuw
Jacques Borlée

Men's 5,000 metres
Emiel Puttemans
Alex Hagelsteens

Men's 10,000 metres
 Alex Hagelsteens
 Heat — 29:47.6 (→ did not advance)

Men's Marathon
 Karel Lismont
 Final — 2:13:27 (→ 9th place)
 Mark Smet
 Final — 2:16:00 (→ 13th place)
 Rik Schoofs
 Final — 2:17:28 (→ 18th place)

Men's 4×400 metres Relay
 Eddy de Leeuw, Danny Roelandt, Rik Vandenberghe, and Fons Brijdenbach
 Heat — did not finish (→ did not advance)

Men's High Jump
Guy Moreau
 Qualification — 2.21 m
 Final — 2.18 m (→ 14th place)

Men's Pole Vault
Patrick Desruelles 
 Qualification — no mark (→ did not advance)

Women's 200 metres
Karin Verguts
Lea Alaerts

Women's 400 metres
Rosine Wallez
Anne Michel

Women's 800 metres
Anne-Marie Van Nuffel 
 Heat — 2:00.1 
 Semifinals — 2:02.0 (→ did not advance)

Men's 4×400 metres Relay
Lea Alaerts
Regina Berg
Anne Michel
Rosine Wallez

Women's High Jump
Christine Soetewey
 Qualification — 1.88 m
 Final — 1.85 m (→ 12th place)

Canoeing

Cycling

Twelve cyclists represented Belgium in 1980.

Individual road race
 Luc De Smet
 Jan Nevens
 Ronald Van Avermaet
 Jan Wijnants

Team time trial
 Patrick du Chau
 Marc Sergeant
 Gerrit Van Gestel
 Leo Wellens

1000m time trial
 Jan Blomme

Individual pursuit
 Joseph Smeets

Team pursuit
 Jan Blomme
 Diederik Foubert
 Jozef Simons
 Joseph Smeets

Fencing

Three fencers, two men and one woman, represented Belgium in 1980.

Men's foil
 Stéphane Ganeff
 Thierry Soumagne

Men's épée
 Stéphane Ganeff
 Thierry Soumagne

Women's foil
 Micheline Borghs

Judo

Shooting

Swimming

Women's 800m Freestyle
 Pascale Verbauwen
 Final — 8.44,84 (→ 6th place)

Women's 100m Backstroke
 Carine Verbauwen
 Final — 1.03,82 (→ 5th place)

Women's 200m Backstroke
 Yolande van der Straeten
 Final — 2.15,58 (→ 5th place)
 Carine Verbauwen
 Final — 2.16,66 (→ 6th place)

Women's 100m Breaststroke
 Brigitte Bosmans
 Heats — 1:16.68 (→ did not advance)

Women's 400 m Individual Medley
Christel Fechner
 Heats — 4:56.92 (→ did not advance)

Women's 4 × 100 m Medley Relay
 Yolande van der Straeten, Brigitte Bosmans, Carine Verbauwen, and Pascale Verbauwen
 Heats — 4.26,33 (→ did not advance)

Weightlifting

Wrestling

References

Nations at the 1980 Summer Olympics
1980
Olympic